Philip H. Lathrop, A.S.C. (October 22, 1912 – April 12, 1995) was an American cinematographer noted for his skills with wide screen technology and detailed approach to lighting and camera placement. He spent most of his life in movie studios. Lathrop was known for such films as Touch of Evil (1958), Lonely Are the Brave (1962), The Americanization of Emily (1964), The Cincinnati Kid (1965), Point Blank (1967), Finian's Rainbow (1968), The Traveling Executioner (1970), Portnoy's Complaint (1972), Earthquake (1974), Swashbuckler (1976), The Driver (1978), Moment by Moment (1978), A Change of Seasons (1980), Foolin' Around (1980), Loving Couples (1980), and Deadly Friend (1986).

He was a long-time member of the ASC Board of Directors, as well as co-chairman of the ASC Awards committee. He also participated in the affairs of the Academy of Motion Picture Arts and Sciences and the Academy of Television Arts and Sciences.

Early life
Lathrop was born in Merced, California on October 22, 1912. As a child, the Universal Studios lot was his playground, where his mother was employed in the film lab. Lathrop became a member there in the camera department at 18-years old. There, he watched Gilbert Warrenton, ASC, photograph the first version of Show Boat in 1928–29. On the 1936 version of the film, Lathrop loaded cameras from John Mescall, ASC.

Personal life
Lathrop had two marriages, to Molly Lathrop and Betty Jo Lathrop, and three sons, Larry, Bill and Clark.

Career
Lathrop began his career as a film loader in Universal’s camera department in 1934 for Russell Metty, ASC, on the Irving Reis film, All My Sons.

In 1938, he became assistant to Universal’s top-ranking cinematographer Joseph A. Valentine, ASC, and worked on the Deanna Durbin pictures, The Wolf Man, and two Alfred Hitchcock classics, Saboteur and Shadow of a Doubt. Later, he once again worked as a camera operator with Russell Metty for nine years where he shot the opening of Orson Welles’ Touch of Evil, one of the most renowned boom shots in the history of cinema.

Lathrop becomes director of photography at Universal in 1958. His first feature that year was The Perfect Furlough, which was shot in CinemaScope and Eastman Color, with director Blake Edwards who Lathrop also worked with on Experiment in Terror, Days of Wine and Roses, and The Pink Panther. In 1959, Lathrop and Edwards collaborated on the television series, Peter Gunn and Mr. Lucky.

Using the new Panavision lenses, Lathrop shot the 1962 black and white drama, Lonely Are the Brave, with director David Miller in New Mexico’s Sandia Mountains—this is an early example of the 2.35:1 aspect ratio. Lathrop’s particular visual style seems to epitomize the times, such as in Point Blank, directed by John Boorman in 1967, where a glossy, dense feel was utilized to a tough thriller. In this film, color charts were prepared for each scene—the colors were subdued and desaturated and no scene was ever too bright or showy. After Point Blank, Lathrop worked on Francis Ford Coppola’s Finian’s Rainbow, another unusual color film.

He was inducted into the ASC Hall of Fame in 1974. During the 1980s, Lathrop worked on eight television movies-of-the-week as well as several mini-series, winning him several Emmys.

He died of cancer on April 12, 1995 in Los Angeles, the same year he was honored with the 1992 ASC Lifetime Achievement Award. Services were held at the Forest Lawn Cemetery in Hollywood Hills where Stanley Cortez, ASC, delivered the eulogy.

Photography in Earthquake
In the 1974 disaster film Earthquake, Lathrop made director Mark Robson’s vision of the movie come true. Robson wanted a natural look for the film, without its being documentary-like. Instead of shooting in natural locations, Earthquake was filmed almost entirely on the Universal Studios' sound stages and back-lot due to the extraordinary degree of control deemed necessary to execute the required special effects. To bring the earthquake scenes to life, a shaker mount for the camera was created. Lathrop said it “created an amazing illusion. You’d swear that the ground was going up and down and moving sideways, when, of course, it wasn’t moving at all.” Sets were also built on shaker platforms, which is incredibly costly so “in the sets that were not on shaker platforms, [it] was [difficult] to get the actors to move as if they were responding to an earthquake, when there wasn’t one,” he added.

A five-story section of what is supposed to be a 25-story building was made in Stage 12, the highest in the studio, where every floor was used to shoot the action. Lathrop stated that “it was necessary to dig down 20 feet into the floor of the stage in order to accommodate [the building model].” He continued, “[the] photography of this sequence was difficult because of the way [they] had to light the set” to avoid shadows from the hanging lights when the simulated earthquakes took place. So “in order to light it, [Lathrop] went clear up above the grids with four arcs pointed down to simulate the angle of the sun. [He] matched each of the arcs on the way down and didn’t overlap them, nor did [he] use any fill light at all.” 

To execute a film like Earthquake, natural sets would have been very limiting. Shooting on set allows for control in the lighting and to “do things with the camera that would have been impossible in a natural set,” said Lathrop. Without a single day off of work after Earthquake, Lathrop immediately began working on Airport 1975, also for Universal Studios.

Academy Award nominations
•	1965 - Best Cinematography, Black-and-White - The Americanization of Emily
•	1975 - Best Cinematography - Earthquake

Awards
Primetime Emmy Awards
•	1984 – Outstanding Cinematography for a Limited Series or a Special – Celebrity, nominated
•	1985 – Outstanding Cinematography for a Limited Series or a Special – Malice in Wonderland, won
•	1986 – Outstanding Cinematography for a Limited Miniseries or a Special – Picking Up the Pieces, nominated
•	1987 – Outstanding Cinematography for a Limited Miniseries or a Special – Christmas Snow, won
•	1988 – Outstanding Cinematography for a Limited Miniseries or a Special – Little Girl Lost, nominated
American Society of Cinematographers
•	1988 – Outstanding Achievement in Cinematography in Miniseries or Specials – Christmas Snow, won
•	1989 – Outstanding Achievement in Cinematography in Movies of the Week/Pilots – Little Girl Lost, won
•	1992 – Lifetime Achievement Award, won
Society of Camera Operators
•	1999 – Historical Shot – Touch of Evil, won

Filmography
•	Live Fast, Die Young (1958)
•	Girls on the Loose (1958)
•	The Saga of Hemp Brown (1958) as Philip Lathrop
•	Wild Heritage (1958) as Philip Lathrop
•	The Perfect Furlough (1958) as Philip Lathrop
•	Money, Women and Guns (1958) as Philip Lathrop
•	Rawhide (TV Series: 9 episodes, 1958) as Philip Lathrop
•	The Monster of Piedras Blancas (1958) Director of Photography
•	Steve Canyon (TV Series: 11 episodes, 1959)
•	Cry Tough (1959)
•	Walt Disney’s Wonderful World of Color (TV Series: 2 episodes, 1959) as Philip Lathrop
•	The Private Lives of Adam and Eve (1960)
•	Mr. Lucky (TV Series: 4 episodes, 1960; 21 episodes, 1959–1960) Director of Photography
•	Peter Gunn (TV Series: 61 episodes, 1958–1960) as Philip Lathrop
•	Hong Kong (TV Series: 24 episodes, 1960–1961) Director of Photography
•	Perry Mason (TV Series: 2 episodes, 1961) Director of Photography
•	Breakfast at Tiffany’s (1961) co-cinematographer, uncredited
•	Experiment in Terror (1962) Director of Photography
•	Lonely Are the Brave (1962) Director of Photography
•	Combat! (TV Series: 1 episode, 1962) Director of Photography
•	Days of Wine and Roses (1962) Director of Photography
•	Dime with a Halo (1963)
•	Vacation Playhouse (TV Series: 1 episode, 1963) Director of Photography
•	Twilight of Honor (1963) Director of Photography
•	Soldier in the Rain (1963) Director of Photography
•	The Pink Panther (1963) Director of Photography
•	The Americanization of Emily (1964) as Philip Lathrop
•	36 Hours (1964)
•	Girl Happy (1965) Director of Photography
•	The Cincinnati Kid (1965) Director of Photography
•	Never Too Late (1965) as Philip Lathrop
•	What Did You Do in the War, Daddy? (1966) Director of Photography
•	The Happening (1967) Director of Photography
•	Don't Make Waves (1967)
•	Gunn (1967) Director of Photography
•	Point Blank (1967) Director of Photography
•	I Love You, Alice B. Toklas! (1968) Director of Photography
•	Finian’s Rainbow (1968) Director of Photography
•	The Illustrated Man (1969) Director of Photography
•	The Gypsy Moths (1969) as Philip Lathrop
•	They Shoot Horses, Don’t They? (1969) Director of Photography
•	The Hawaiians (1970) Director of Photography
•	The Traveling Executioner (1970) Director of Photography
•	Rabbit, Run (1970)
•	Wild Rovers (1971) Director of Photography
•	Every Little Crook and Nanny (1972) as Philip Lathrop
•	Portnoy’s Complaint (1972) as Philip Lathrop
•	Lolly-Madonna XXX (1973) as Philip Lathrop
•	The Thief Who Came to Dinner (1973) as Philip Lathrop
•	The All-American Boy (1973)
•	Mame (1974) Director of Photography
•	Together Brothers (1974)
•	Airport 1975 (1974) Director of Photography
•	Earthquake (1974) Director of Photography
•	The Prisoner of Second Avenue (1975) as Philip Lathrop
•	Three for the Road (TV Series: 1 episode, 1975) Director of Photography
•	Hard Times (1975) Director of Photography
•	The Killer Elite (1975) Director of Photography
•	The Black Bird (1975)
•	What Now, Catherine Curtis? (TV Movie, 1976) as Philip Lathrop
•	Swashbuckler (1976) as Philip Lathrop
•	Airport '77 (1977) Director of Photography
•	The Feather and Father Gang (TV Series: 1 episode, 1977) as Philip Lathrop
•	Never Con a Killer (TV Movie, 1977)
•	Captain Courageous (TV Movie, 1977)
•	A Different Story (1978)
•	The Driver (1978) Director of Photography
•	Moment by Moment (1978) Director of Photography
•	The Concorde ... Airport '79 (1979) Director of Photography
•	Little Miss Marker (1980)
•	Loving Couples (1980)
•	Foolin' Around (1980)
•	A Change of Seasons (1980) Director of Photography
•	All Night Long (1981) as Philip Lathrop
•	Class Reunion (1982) Director of Photography 
•	Jekyll and Hyde... Together Again (1982) Director of Photography 
•	Celebrity (TV Mini-Series: 3 episodes, 1984) as Philip Lathrop
•	Malice in Wonderland (TV Movie, 1985)
•	Love on the Run (TV Movie, 1985)
•	Picking Up the Pieces (TV Movie, 1985)
•	Between the Darkness and the Dawn (TV Movie, 1985)
•	Mr. and Mrs. Ryan (TV Movie, 1986) as Philip Lathrop
•	Deadly Friend (1986)
•	Christmas Snow (TV Movie, 1986)
•	Six Against the Rock (TV Movie, 1987) as Philip Lathrop
•	Ray’s Male Heterosexual Dance Hall (Short, 1987)
•	Little Girl Lost (TV Movie, 1988)

Camera and Electrical Department
•	The Cat Creeps (1946) assistant camera – uncredited
•	All My Sons (1948) camera operator – uncredited
•	Mr. Peabody and the Mermaid (1948) camera operator – uncredited
•	You Gotta Stay Happy (1948) assistant camera – uncredited
•	Kiss the Blood Off My Hands (1948) assistant camera – uncredited
•	The Lady Gambles (1949) - camera operator – uncredited
•	Peggy (1950) - camera operator – as Philip Lathrop
•	The Desert Hawk (1950) - camera operator – uncredited
•	Wyoming Mail (1950) - camera operator – uncredited
•	Little Egypt (1951) - camera operator – uncredited
•	The Raging Tide (1951) - camera operator – uncredited
•	Flame of Araby (1951) - camera operator – uncredited
•	The Treasure of Lost Canyon (1952) - camera operator
•	Scarlet Angel (1952) - camera operator – uncredited
•	Yankee Buccaneer (1952) - camera operator – uncredited
•	Against All Flags (1952) - camera operator – uncredited
•	Seminole (1953) - camera operator – uncredited
•	It Happens Every Thursday (1953) - camera operator
•	The Man from the Alamo (1953) - camera operator – uncredited
•	The Veils of Bagdad (1953) - camera operator
•	All That Heaven Allows (1955) - camera operator – uncredited
•	Man Afraid (1957) - camera operator
•	Touch of Evil (1958) - camera operator – uncredited
•	In Harm's Way (1965) - camera operator: second unit – as Philip Lathrop
•	Hammett (1982) – cinematographer: other photography – as Philip Lathrop

Miscellaneous Crew
•	Visions of Light (Documentary, 1992) member: ASC Education Committee – as Philip Lathrop

References

External links

1912 births
1995 deaths
American cinematographers
Burials at Forest Lawn Memorial Park (Hollywood Hills)